White Album is a 1994 mini-album by Dutch singer Valensia. It was only released in Japan.

Track listing
21st Century New Christmas Time – 4:47
The Ex (July July) – 3:32 
A View to a Kill – 4:44 
The March of Scaraboushka – 2:33 
Singing the Swan – 3:01

References 

1994 albums
Valensia albums